My Conscience and I is the debut album by Remi Nicole, released in the UK on December 3, 2007, on the Universal label.

Track listing
Go With The Flow  4:03
Rock 'n' Roll  3:56
New Old Days  5:13
Fed Up (album version)  3:45
Na Nighty  3:08
Lights Out  5:57
Tabloid Queen  4:12
Right Side Of Me  5:09
Go Mr. Sunshine (album version)  4:23
Soulback  3:02
Dates From Hell  3:52
Inside Of Me  6:47

Singles

"Fed Up" 14 May 2007 (Island)
"Go Mr Sunshine"  20 Aug 2007 (Island) UK Top 100 - #57
"Rock 'n' Roll" 26 Nov 2007 (Island)
“Lights Out” March 2008 (Island)

References

External links
 http://www.contactmusic.com/new/artist.nsf/artistnames/remi%20nicole

2007 albums
Remi Nicole albums